Ridge of Capard is a mountain in Laois, Ireland.

See also
List of mountains in Ireland
Geography of Ireland

References

Mountains and hills of County Laois
Geography of County Laois